"She and I" is a song written by Dave Loggins, and recorded by American country music band Alabama.  It was released in January 1986, as the only single from their first Greatest Hits compilation album.

The song was their 19th consecutive No. 1 song on the Billboard magazine Hot Country Singles chart in April 1986.

Content
The song is an uptempo, rock-tinged song professing marital lust.

Critical reception
Country music writer Tom Roland noted that the song "featured a barrage of unique sounds," including a "strange drum effect" (the echo for each snare drum beat would end with a pop, instead of "decaying"). Also, the album version of the song featured a false ending (much like Elvis Presley's "Suspicious Minds"), whereby the song fades out before returning to full volume and then fading back out.

Music video
The music video was directed by David Hogan and premiered in early 1986.

Single and album edits
The version of "She and I" released for radio airplay, the music video, and retail sale as a 7-inch single is nearly two minutes shorter than the full-length album version. Among other noticeable differences, the single version's end is abridged and does not include the false fade.

Chart positions

References

Millard, Bob, "Country Music: 70 Years of America's Favorite Music," HarperCollins, New York, 1993
Roland, Tom, "The Billboard Book of Number One Country Hits," Billboard Books, Watson-Guptill Publications, New York, 1991

1985 singles
1985 songs
Alabama (American band) songs
Songs written by Dave Loggins
Song recordings produced by Harold Shedd
RCA Records singles